William Mackenzie Fraser (6 April 1878 – 13 September 1960) was a New Zealand labourer, civil engineer, local politician, conservationist and ethnological collector. He was born in Auckland, Auckland, New Zealand on 6 April 1878.

References

1878 births
1960 deaths
Local politicians in New Zealand
New Zealand conservationists
New Zealand ethnologists
20th-century New Zealand engineers